Vladimir Sergeyevich Mironchikov (born 30 September 1998) is a Serbian boxer. He participated at the 2021 AIBA World Boxing Championships, being awarded the bronze medal in the light heavyweight event. Mironchikov was the first and only person of his country to win a medal. In a match, he was defeated by Robby Gonzales.

References

External links 

1998 births
Living people
Place of birth missing (living people)
Serbian male boxers
Light-heavyweight boxers
AIBA World Boxing Championships medalists
21st-century Serbian people
Competitors at the 2022 Mediterranean Games
Mediterranean Games gold medalists for Serbia
Mediterranean Games medalists in boxing